The 2006 Tallahassee mayoral election was held on September 5, 2006, to elect the Mayor of Tallahassee.

Incumbent mayor John Marks was reelected for 2nd term by over 77% of the vote.

Results

References

2006
2006 Florida elections
2006 United States mayoral elections